John Francis McNulty (11 August 1879 – 8 June 1943) was an English prelate of the Roman Catholic Church. He served as Bishop of Nottingham from 1932 until his death in 1943.

Born in Collyhurst, Manchester on 11 August 1879, he was educated at St Bede's College, Manchester from 1891 to 1894, then at Ushaw College, St Edmund's College, Cambridge and at Oscott College. He was ordained to the priesthood on 16 April 1911.

Following ordination Fr McNulty returned to St Bede's College as College Prefect, he remained in that post until 1921 when he was appointed Master of St Edmund's House, Cambridge. In 1930, Fr McNulty was recalled to the Salford Diocese to take up the post of Parish Priest at St Anne's Church, Ancoats, where he remained for two years.

On 13 May 1932, McNulty was appointed the sixth Bishop of Nottingham by Pope Pius XI. He received his episcopal consecration on the following 11 June from Cardinal Francis Bourne, Archbishop of Westminster, with Bishops Peter Amigo of Southwark and Thomas Henshaw of Salford serving as co-consecrators.

McNulty died in office on 8 June 1943, aged 63 - three days before the eleventh anniversary of his consecration as bishop.

References

1879 births
1943 deaths
20th-century Roman Catholic bishops in England
Masters of St Edmund's College, Cambridge
People from Collyhurst
People educated at St Bede's College, Manchester
Clergy from Manchester
Roman Catholic bishops of Nottingham